Motohira (written: 基衡 or 基平) is a masculine Japanese given name. Notable people with the name include:

, ruler of Northern Fujiwara in Mutsu Province, Japan
, Japanese kugyō

Japanese masculine given names